The following is a list of children's podcasts.

List

See also 

 List of advice podcasts
 List of fantasy podcasts
 List of pop culture podcasts

References 

Lists of podcasts
Children's podcasts